The 2018 AFL Tasmania TSL premiership season is an Australian rules football competition staged across Tasmania, Australia over twenty-one home and away rounds and six finals series matches between 30 March and 15 September.

The League was known as the Bupa TSL under a commercial naming-rights sponsorship agreement with the company.

Before the season started there were three team changes to the competition with Burnie and Devonport departing the league. 
Hobart City were replaced in the competition by North Hobart who returned to the competition after a 4-year absence.

Participating clubs
Clarence District Football Club
Glenorchy District Football Club
Lauderdale Football Club
Launceston Football Club
North Hobart Football Club
North Launceston Football Club
Tigers Football Club

2018 TSL coaches
Jeromey Webberley (Clarence)
Paul Kennedy (Glenorchy)
Darren Winter (Lauderdale)
Sam Lonergan (Launceston)
Richard Robinson (North Hobart)
Taylor Whitford (North Launceston)
Trent Baumeler (Tigers FC)

Awards
 Alastair Lynch Medal (Best afield throughout season): Josh Ponting (North Launceston) 
 RACT Insurance Player of the Year (Best player voted by the media): Daniel Joseph (Glenorchy) and Taylor Whitford (North Launceston)
 Matthew Richardson Medal (Rookie of the Year): Sherrin Egger (North Launceston)
 Baldock Medal (Grand Final Best on Ground): Bradley Cox-Goodyer (North Launceston) 
 Cazaly Medal (Premiership Coach in TSL): Taylor Whitford (North Launceston) 
 Hudson Medal (Highest goal kicker in TSL season): Mitch Thorp (Launceston) 62 Goals

2018 TSL leading goalkickers
Mitch Thorp (Launceston) - 66
Jaye Bowden (Glenorchy) - 46

Highest Individual Goalkickers In a Match
 8 – Jaye Bowden (Glenorchy) v (North Hobart) – 16 June 2018 at North Hobart Oval
 8 – Mitch Thorp (Launceston) v (Tigers FC) – 5 May 2018 at Windsor Park
 7 – Jacob Gillbee (Lauderdale) v (North Hobart) – 11 August 2018 at North Hobart Oval
 7 – Ben McGuinness (Lauderdale) v (Glenorchy) – 14 July 2018 at Lauderdale Oval
 7 – Mitch Thorp (Launceston) v (North Hobart) – 7 April 2018 at Windsor Park

Premiership season
Source:

Round 1

Round 2

Round 3

Round 4

Round 5

Round 6

Round 7

Round 8

Round 9

Round 10

Round 11

Round 12

Round 13

Round 14

Round 15

Round 16

Round 17

Round 18

Round 19

Round 20

Round 21

Ladder

Season records

Highest club scores
 30.20. (200) – North Launceston v North Hobart 4 August 2018 at North Hobart Oval
 28.21. (189) - North Launceston v North Hobart 28 April 2018 at North Hobart Oval
 26.16. (172) – Lauderdale v North Hobart 11 August 2018 at North Hobart Oval

Lowest club scores
 1.5. (11) – North Hobart v Glenorchy 22.23. (155) – 28 July 2018 at KGV Oval
 1.8. (14) – Tigers FC v Clarence 8.17. (65) – 12 May 2018 at Twin Ovals Complex
 2.4. (16) – North Hobart v Launceston 21.21. (147) – 7 April 2018 at Windsor Park

TSL Team Of The Year

TSL Finals Series

Elimination Final 
(Saturday 25 August)

 Clarence: 6.11.47
 Lauderdale: 15.15.105

at Blundstone Arena

Qualifying Final 
(Saturday 25 August)

 Glenorchy: 13.10.88
 Launceston: 10.14.74

at Blundstone Arena

1st Semi-Final 
(Saturday 1 September)

 Launceston: 6.6.42
 Lauderdale: 17.12.114

at UTAS Stadium

2nd Semi-Final 
(Saturday 1 September)

 North Launceston: 14.11.95
 Glenorchy: 5.7.37

at UTAS Stadium

Preliminary Final 
(Saturday 8 September)

 Glenorchy: 11.5.71
 Lauderdale: 13.11.89

at Blundstone Arena

Grand Final

Development League Grand Final 
(Saturday 23 September)
 Launceston: 7.7. (49)
 North Launceston:  2.3. (15)
at UTAS Stadium

References

External links
 Tasmanian State League Website
 AFL Tasmania

2018
2018 in Australian rules football